Habel Creek is a stream in Alberta, Canada.

Habel Creek has the name of Jean Habel, a pioneer citizen.

See also
List of rivers of Alberta

References

Rivers of Alberta